Helichrysum balfourii is a species of flowering plant in the family Asteraceae.
It is found only in Yemen.
Its natural habitat is subtropical or tropical dry forests.

References

balfourii
Endemic flora of Socotra
Least concern plants
Taxonomy articles created by Polbot